The Engagements on Lake Ontario encompass the prolonged naval contest for control of the lake during the War of 1812. Few actions were fought, none of which had decisive results. The contest essentially became a naval building race, sometimes referred to sarcastically as the "Battle of the Carpenters."

Operations in 1812
When war was first declared, the British had an early advantage on the Great Lakes in that they possessed a quasi-naval body, the Provincial Marine. Although not particularly well manned or efficient, its ships were initially unopposed on Lake Erie and Lake Huron, and made possible the decisive early victories of Major General Isaac Brock.

The chief officer was Commodore John Steel, who was seventy-five years old, or even older. He was retired and replaced by Commander Hugh Earle. The Americans possessed only one brig,  under Lieutenant Melancthon Taylor Woolsey, and a small navy yard at Sackets Harbor, New York. On 19 July, five vessels of the Provincial Marine attacked Oneida in the First Battle of Sackett's Harbor but were beaten off.

To redress matters, on 3 September, the United States Navy appointed Commodore Isaac Chauncey, then commanding the New York Navy Yard, to command on the lakes. Although Chauncey was nominally in charge of the naval force on Lake Erie also, he took little part in its construction or operations there but concentrated his attention on Lake Ontario. To supplement Oneida, he first purchased or commandeered several trading vessels (including some captured Canadian schooners), but he also dispatched thousands of carpenters, shipwrights and so on to Sacket's Harbor to construct proper fighting ships. The chief architects were Adam Brown, his brother Noah, and Henry Eckford. They launched their first new ship, the corvette , on 26 November. The trees from which it was constructed had still been standing in September.

Chauncey hoisted his broad pendant aboard Oneida on 6 November and with his squadron, pursued the British ship Royal George into Kingston. He too was beaten off, partly by shore batteries and gunboats, and partly because a gun exploded aboard the schooner Pert, mortally injuring the schooner's commander and throwing the American squadron into confusion. After this engagement winter closed in, immobilising the ships of both sides in port. Chauncey feared an attack across the ice by British regular soldiers, and kept his carpenters sawing the ice from around his vessels so that they could be slewed to bring fire to bear on any attackers. However, the British had no intention at that stage of making such an attack.

The British began building two corvettes to match Madison, one each at Kingston and York. Their efforts were hindered, especially at York, by disputes between shipwright Thomas Plucknett, who had been selected by Lieutenant General Sir George Prevost, the Governor General, to superintend the work, and officers such as Captain Andrew Gray, a staff officer in the Army in Upper Canada. Plucknett's work was reckoned to be disorganised, as was that of the shipwright at Kingston, who was dismissed and replaced by the more experienced Daniel Allen. Allen in turn was removed after fomenting disputes over working conditions in March 1813.

Three officers (acting Commanders Robert Heriot Barclay, Robert Finnis and Daniel Pring) had been detached by Vice Admiral Herbert Sawyer from the Royal Navy's North American Station in Halifax, Nova Scotia to the Provincial Marine, and did much over the winter to refit the existing vessels at Kingston. However, the Admiralty independently appointed Captain James Lucas Yeo to command the naval establishment on the Great Lakes. He collected reinforcements and materials in Britain, and crossed the Atlantic early in 1813.

Operations in 1813
Chauncey had the advantage in ships and men once the ice melted. He and General Henry Dearborn, the commander-in-chief of the American armies in the north, had the opportunity to strike a blow before British seamen and officers from England could reach Canada and travel up the St. Lawrence River. An attack on Kingston would have been decisive, but Chauncey and Dearborn persuaded themselves that it was defended by 5,000 British regulars (there were in fact only 600). They instead attacked York, the provincial capital. On 27 April at the Battle of York, they defeated the outnumbered defenders under Major General Roger Hale Sheaffe and looted the town. They captured the brig Duke of Gloucester and also several cannon which had been destined for the British squadron on Lake Erie (this capture contributed to the later American victory at the Battle of Lake Erie). The British themselves set fire to the part-completed corvette  to prevent it falling into American hands.

Chauncey and Dearborn next defeated the British army on the Niagara River at the Battle of Fort George on 27 May. At both York and Fort George, Chauncey's schooners and gunboats (commanded at the latter engagement by Oliver Hazard Perry) had proved very effective in supporting troops landing from boats, by suppressing British batteries and inflicting heavy casualties on British troops who attempted to prevent the Americans landing.

The American commanders had left themselves vulnerable to a potentially decisive counter-attack. While they were preoccupied at the western end of Lake Ontario, Commodore Yeo had arrived in Kingston, accompanied by 465 officers and seamen of the Royal Navy, to take charge of the British squadron. Embarking troops under Prevost, who happened to be in Kingston on public and Army business, he almost immediately attacked the American base in the Second Battle of Sacket's Harbor on 29 May. Although this was a strategically bold stroke, both Yeo and Prevost attacked cautiously and called off the attack when they met with stiff resistance. The Americans had prematurely set fire to the captured Duke of Gloucester and a heavy sloop-of-war under construction, but managed to put out the fire when the British withdrew. Duke of Gloucester and large quantities of stores were destroyed, but General Pike was saved.

Chauncey hastened back to Sacket's Harbor, and remained there awaiting the completion of General Pike. While the Americans declined to contest the lake, Yeo's squadron assisted in driving the American army on the Niagara peninsula back into Fort George. His vessels captured several unguarded batteaux carrying supplies and equipment for the American troops, and raided encampments on their line of communication. On 1 July, Yeo attempted to destroy General Pike while she was fitting out by mounting a raid on Sacket's Harbor in small boats, but called off the attack fearing correctly that deserters had alerted the Americans.

Chauncey's full squadron put out on 21 July. They first embarked a battalion of 250 infantry under Colonel Winfield Scott and contemplated an assault on the British defensive positions at Burlington Heights at the western end of the lake. They found that the waters around the British position were too shallow to allow Chauncey's vessels to support any landing, and the defenders were too numerous and well-prepared for Scott to risk an unsupported attack. Instead, they briefly captured York again, this time causing little loss, and returned some property looted in the earlier attack.

Action off the Niagara
On 7 August, the Americans encountered Yeo off the mouth of the Niagara River. The two squadrons spent several days in cautious manoeuvres. Chauncey had an advantage in long guns and waited for calm conditions in which he could engage at long range, while Yeo had the advantage in carronades and wanted to close in heavy weather. On the night of 8 August, two American schooners ( and ) capsized and sank in a sudden squall. Of the 72 men aboard both schooners, 53 were drowned.

On 10 August, the British were to windward. Chauncey formed his squadron into two lines; six schooners were nearest the British, with the heavier ships further away to leeward. As the British edged closer, firing became general. At 11:30 am, Chauncey ordered his windward line to steer downwind and reform to leeward of the heavy vessels. Rather than try to beat upwind to rescue the two schooners, Chauncey withdrew downwind, hoping that Yeo would follow him. Instead, Yeo concentrated on the two isolated schooners, both of which were captured.

Action off the Genesee
Both squadrons withdrew to their bases for provisions before setting out again. The British squadron was becalmed and for several hours, the American schooners fired at them from long range, while the British attempted to work their vessels out of range by towing them with boats and using sweeps (long oars) through the gunports of the vessels. Towards evening, a land breeze sprang up, which allowed Yeo to pull away and withdraw into Amherst Bay.

Action off Burlington
On 28 September, the two squadrons met again in York Bay. Chauncey was actually covering a proposed movement of the American army from the Niagara to Sacket's Harbor, while Yeo had just delivered supplies to the British forces on the Niagara peninsula. Both squadrons spotted each other early in the morning. They headed north until Yeo had sent a boat into York with dispatches, then reversed course and headed south in a heavy wind, with Yeo ahead and to leeward.

At about 12:40 pm, Yeo abruptly reversed course, intending to exchange a single broadside with General Pike while they passed on opposite tacks, and then concentrate against the weaker schooners at the rear of Chauncey's line. However, Chauncey also reversed course and General Pike and Yeo's flagship, Wolfe, exchanged several broadsides on the same tack. The American fire brought down Wolfes mizzen- and main-topmasts. Yeo's second in command, Commander William Mulcaster, interposed his ship, Royal George, between Wolfe and General Pike and backed his sails while the crew of Wolfe cleared away the wreckage and headed downwind towards Burlington Bay at the western end of the lake.

For a while, the two squadrons were mixed up together, and Chauncey's flag captain, Arthur Sinclair, urged Chauncey to capture the two rearmost British vessels (Beresford and Melville) but Chauncey apparently exclaimed "All or none" and chased after Wolfe. He nevertheless refused to cast off the towline to Asp, and no other American vessels were able to get within effective range.

After a chase lasting ninety minutes, Yeo dropped anchor off the north shore of Burlington Bay. The wind had risen to a gale, the American squadron had straggled, and General Pike herself had received damage. (There were several holes beneath the water line forward, and a cannon on the forecastle had exploded, causing several casualties and much destruction. Several other cannon had split and could not be used in case they also burst.) Chauncey called off the action, stating officially that if he had tried to continue the attack, both British and American squadrons might be driven ashore, into British-held territory.

Later operations
While Yeo made hasty repairs in Burlington Bay, Chauncey effectively controlled the lake. From 29 September, there was a gale which prevented Chauncey watching Yeo. Yeo escaped from Burlington on 2 October. The next day, Chauncey set off in the direction of Yeo's supposed flight. On 5 October, seven vessels were sighted, which turned out to be gunboats and unarmed British schooners transporting troops. One escaped and one was burned. Chauncey captured the other five (which included Growler and Julia), taking 264 prisoners.

The scene of action briefly shifted to the head of the Saint Lawrence River. The American control of the lake had allowed them to complete the movement of their troops from Fort George to Sacket's Harbour in preparation for the planned attack on Montreal late that year. As the army under Major General James Wilkinson moved in many batteaux and other small craft to French Creek near present-day Clayton, New York, some of the British vessels under Commander Mulcaster bombarded their encampments and anchorages until 5 November, when American artillerymen drove them off, setting fire to the brig Earl of Moira with hastily heated red-hot shot. The crew scuttled the brig to extinguish the fire, and later salvaged her.

The American army then began to descend the St. Lawrence. Although Chauncey was supposed to blockade the British in Kingston and prevent them interfering, an effective blockade was difficult in the foul weather of late autumn, and amidst the many islets at the head of the river. This allowed Mulcaster's vessels to return to Kingston to embark a detachment of troops under Lieutenant Colonel Joseph Wanton Morrison and pursue the Americans down the river. On 11 November, Morrison's force, aided by three gunboats under Mulcaster, defeated the Americans at the Battle of Crysler's Farm.

The last event of the year was the transport of William Henry Harrison's troops from the Niagara to Sackett's Harbor, to replace Wilkinson's army. However, this left the Niagara frontier denuded of regular troops, and the British took advantage of this in the Capture of Fort Niagara and the Battle of Buffalo.

Vessels on Lake Ontario in 1813
Both sides (especially the British) renamed, re-rigged and re-armed their ships several times during the war. Both sides also possessed several unarmed schooners or other small vessels for use as transports or tenders.

Operations in 1814

May to July
Over the winter of 1813–14, the Americans diverted shipbuilder Noah Brown and some shipwrights and materials to Lake Champlain, which allowed them to construct the squadron which later won the decisive Battle of Plattsburgh. In Kingston, an officer, Captain Richard O'Conor, who had served alongside Yeo during his earlier career, had been in charge of the dockyards since he arrived in May 1813, and had greatly extended the facilities.

Having been outgunned by Chauncey's vessels in 1813, Yeo had ordered the construction of two big frigates ( and ). When these were ready shortly after the ice broke up, he held the initial advantage. On 6 May, he mounted the Raid on Fort Oswego to interrupt the supply line from the New York Navy Yard to Sacket's Harbor. The raid was partially successful and the British captured several unarmed vessels, including the schooner Growler which changed hands for the third time.

Yeo's main aim had been to capture heavy guns intended for Chauncey's own new frigates and heavy brigs, but although seven guns had been captured with Growler, most of the American guns had not yet reached Oswego and were still  up the Oswego River. Yeo and the troops under Lieutenant General Gordon Drummond did not attempt to capture them. Instead, Yeo established a blockade to prevent them reaching Sacket's Harbor. A few weeks later, Lieutenant Woolsey nevertheless tried to take several boats loaded with cannon, cables and other stores for Chauncey's new ships to Sacket's Harbor but was driven into a creek a few miles south of the base. A party of British marines and sailors under Captain Stephen Popham proceeded up the creek to "cut out" the American boats, but on 30 May they were ambushed and all were killed or captured at the Battle of Big Sandy Creek.

However, his squadron was not ready for service until mid-July, and then delayed in port until the end of the month, as Chauncey was ill but refused to delegate responsibility to his second in command, Captain Jacob Jones. This seriously hindered the operations of the American army commanded by Major General Jacob Brown, and forced him to abandon a projected attack on Kingston and make an attack across the upper Niagara River instead. When the American squadron eventually did set out onto the lake, Yeo quickly retired into Kingston. The pattern for the year was set; whichever flotilla had a fleeting disadvantage in ships or guns stayed in harbour until they had built something bigger.

August to October

While the Americans controlled the lake, they destroyed a 10-gun brig under construction at Presque Isle on the Saint Lawrence before it could be launched.

On 5 August, three British vessels (Netley, Charwell, and Magnet) sailed from York to the Niagara River with supplies. Magnet had sailed later than the other two, and when Chauncey's squadron appeared suddenly, Magnet was unable to escape. After some stores were removed, Magnet was set on fire and blew up before American landing parties could take possession of it. Magnets commander, Lieutenant George Hawkesworth, was court-martialled in November, and found guilty of causing the loss of his vessel. He was dismissed from the Royal Navy, and later defected to the Americans.

However, Chauncey concentrated on "blockading" Kingston, which Yeo had no intention of leaving while he was inferior in strength, and was criticised by Major General Jacob Brown and other army commanders for his failure to assist the American army on the Niagara peninsula any further, which contributed to the indecisive result of the campaign there. Only three of the smaller American vessels maintained a loose blockade of the Niagara River. The crews of the three small British vessels (Star, Netley and Charwell) blockaded in the river under Commander Alexander Dobbs carried a gig and six batteaux overland, and boarded and captured two American schooners, belonging to the squadron on Lake Erie, in the upper reaches of the river. They subsequently took part in a storming attempt during the Siege of Fort Erie, which failed with heavy casualties.

Eventually, on 21 September, Chauncey's ships transported Major General George Izard's division from Sacket's Harbor to the Genesee River to reinforce the American army on the Niagara. Izard, who was senior to Jacob Brown, refused to make an all-out attack on the outnumbered British army, and eventually retired to the American side of the Niagara.

Late October to November

On learning that Chauncey was constructing frigates, Yeo had ordered a ship of the line to be laid down. Originally, Yeo had been authorised to construct a third-rate ship of 74 guns, but under Yeo and local shipwright William Bell (who replaced O'Conor, who had been promoted to post captain and appointed to Princess Charlotte), the plans became rather more ambitious. On 15 October, Yeo put out in the three-decked first-rate ship of the line . On 19 October, lightning struck Saint Lawrence and she only narrowly avoided destruction.

Chauncey retired into Sacket's Harbor and Yeo dominated the lake until 21 November, when winter set in. Like Chauncey, Yeo preferred to cruise off the enemy anchorage, neglecting to support Drummond's badly provisioned British army at the western end of the lake until the last few days of navigation before the lake froze.

Winter to the end of the war
Although the Americans at Sacket's Harbor immediately laid down two ships of the line even larger than St Lawrence, British construction over the winter of 1814–15 matched American attempts to regain the lead. However, Prevost and Yeo were becoming increasingly hostile to each other, following the Battle of Plattsburgh on Lake Champlain. Prevost had recommended that a Rear-Admiral be appointed to Quebec to superintend the Royal Navy's establishment on the Lakes but before this could be considered Prevost himself was relieved, partly because of Yeo's complaints on Prevost's conduct during the Plattsburgh campaign, and also through his conflicts with veteran Army officers of the Peninsular War sent to reinforce the troops in Canada. The Admiralty nevertheless replaced Yeo also, on the grounds of his infrequent returns of accounts and correspondence. His replacement, Captain Edward Owen, did not arrive to take command until after news of the Treaty of Ghent ended hostilities.

Vessels on Lake Ontario in 1814
The rival commanders and propagandists often exaggerated or discounted ships' capabilities during the 1814 campaigning season. Most of the American schooners (converted merchant vessels which had been alarmingly unstable with their heavy armament) had been disarmed and were now used as transports only. The British had re-rigged their schooners as brigs and renamed most of their vessels since many of them formerly belonging to the Provincial Marine had names which duplicated those of Royal Navy ships in commission at sea.

Ships under construction at the end of the war

Aftermath
After the Treaty of Ghent, which ended the war, Britain and the United States in 1817 signed a separate pact, known as the Rush–Bagot Treaty, to limit the number and strength of warships that the parties could maintain on the Lakes. On Lake Ontario, Britain and the United States could keep in commission one vessel each, of no more than 100 tons (bm) and armed with one 18-pounder gun. The parties undertook not to build other armed ships, and to dismantle those already built.

In fact, very few of the existing ships were broken up. The British constructed a storehouse, referred to as a "stone frigate", to keep the rigging and other fittings. The building survives today as dormitory to Hudson Squadron at the Royal Military College of Canada and is still referred to by the same name. In theory, the British could have recommissioned their entire squadron within a few days. By 1827 however, all the ships were mouldering, and unfit for service. The stores were auctioned in 1834 and the surviving ships were written off or disposed of over the next few years. Several were sunk in Navy Bay near Kingston.

The American squadron also quickly fell into disrepair. It had been acknowledged when the vessels were built that they would last only five or six years, with their green wood and rough finish. One survivor was the unfinished ship of the line New Orleans, which was enclosed by a great shed on the slipway. The shed collapsed in 1881 and the remains of the ship were sold in 1883.

Results
Because neither side had been prepared to risk everything in a decisive attack on the enemy fleet or naval base, the result of all the construction effort on Lake Ontario was an expensive draw. The great demands for men and materials made by both squadrons adversely affected other parts of the war effort.

The Americans had been based at Sacket's Harbor, and this small town was unable to cope with the great numbers of soldiers, sailors and shipwrights there. There were many deaths from cold, exposure and inadequate rations during the winter months, and from disease during the summer. (Blackwater Creek, on which the town lay, had no fresh water flowing into it, and quickly became a stagnant sewer.) On the British side, the effort required to ship all the ordnance and naval stores up the Saint Lawrence prevented them from deploying sufficiently large numbers of troops in Upper Canada. Prevost once reported paying £1,000 to transport one monstrous cable for the ship of the line Saint Lawrence to Kingston, and complained that the demands of Yeo's squadron pre-empted the entire transport service up the Saint Lawrence during the later months of 1814.

Historians have criticised both Yeo and Chauncey for their unwillingness to act decisively, and for the long and rambling excuses for their setbacks that they made in their despatches. Chauncey has received more abuse from American historians than Yeo has from British historians. Roosevelt (and subsequent authors) argued that, as the overall American strategy was offensive, the American forces on Lake Ontario ought to have risked an attack against Kingston, or Chauncey should have sought an all-out action against Yeo's squadron when opportunity offered. Instead, Chauncey (and the Army commanders Dearborn and Wilkinson) repeatedly shied away from any attack on Kingston, while Chauncey failed to pursue Yeo to destruction after the action in York Bay on 28 September 1813. After the British attack on Sackett's Harbor, Chauncey continually hampered operations against targets other than Yeo's ships. He either kept his vessels in port waiting for more ships, or refused to use them to support the Army's attacks elsewhere (on the Niagara peninsula, for example).

By contrast, it has been argued that since the British strategy under Governor General Prevost was defensive for most of the war, Yeo needed only to avoid defeat, and certainly succeeded in this. However, British (and Canadian) historians such as Forester and J. Mackay Hitsman have argued that he did so at such cost that other operations were curtailed or thwarted. For example, Yeo's hoarding of men and supplies, and failure to forward sufficient of these to the British squadron on Lake Erie, contributed to their complete defeat. Similarly, a far smaller effort on Lake Champlain than that required to construct ships of the line on Lake Ontario would have made British victory on Champlain certain.

Notes

Citations

References

External links
Chauncey's action off Burlington Bay

Ontario
Battles on the St. Lawrence/Lake Ontario frontier